"Oh-Oh, I'm Falling in Love Again" is a popular song written by Al Hoffman, Dick Manning, George David Weiss, Hugo Peretti and Luigi Creatore and published in 1958.  
The best-known recording of the song was done by Jimmie Rodgers, charting in 1958.  It debuted on the charts in February, and spent 11 weeks on the charts that spring, peaking at #13 on the U.S. Cash Box Top 100 and # 7 on the Billboard Hot 100.  It became a gold record.

The song was later adapted (around 1965) to advertise SpaghettiOs, and Rodgers sang the jingle in the original television ads.

References

1958 singles
Songs written by Al Hoffman
Songs written by Dick Manning
Songs written by Hugo Peretti
Songs written by Luigi Creatore
Songs written by George David Weiss
Jimmie Rodgers (pop singer) songs
1958 songs